For his father who also served as a member of the Illinois House of Representatives, see Arthur Turner

Art Turner (born July 17, 1982) is a Democratic member of the Illinois House of Representatives who serves as a representative for the 9th district. The district he represents includes part of the community areas of the Near West Side, the Near North Side and North Lawndale.

In 2019, Turner would not seek re-election as state representative and would later resign on July 3, 2020.

Electoral history

References

External links
Representative Arthur Turner (D) at the Illinois General Assembly
 By session: 100th, 99th, 98th, 97th, 96th
 Rep Art Turner Jr Official Website

1982 births
Living people
Democratic Party members of the Illinois House of Representatives
Politicians from Chicago
African-American state legislators in Illinois
Morehouse College alumni
Southern Illinois University School of Law alumni
African-American lawyers
American lawyers
21st-century American politicians
21st-century African-American politicians
20th-century African-American people